Laur Marian Aștilean (born 25 July 1973) is a Romanian former footballer who played as a central defender.

Honours
Universitatea Cluj
Divizia C: 2000–01
CFR Cluj
Divizia B: 2003–04
UEFA Intertoto Cup runner-up: 2005

References

External links
Laur Aștilean at Labtof.ro

1973 births
Living people
Romanian footballers
Association football defenders
Liga I players
Liga II players
FC Unirea Dej players
FC Universitatea Cluj players
ACF Gloria Bistrița players
CFR Cluj players
People from Gherla
Romanian football managers